Sandra Masters is a Canadian politician and the current Mayor of Regina, Saskatchewan. Masters is the first female mayor of either of Saskatchewan's major cities. She was first elected in the 2020 Saskatchewan municipal elections.

Masters moved to Regina in 1999 and worked for Richardson Agriculture as the manager of credit for the Prairie Provinces. Since 2014 she had served on the board of Regina Exhibition Association Limited (REAL), but she resigned her role as board chair in order to run for mayor.

Political career 
Masters launched her campaign for Regina's mayoralty on September 16, 2020. Her campaign focused on developing an anti-poverty strategy for the city, supporting the Regina Police Service and local businesses, and reducing city administration costs by 15%. Masters won the election, unseating two-term incumbent mayor Michael Fougere in a nine-person race with 46.4 per cent of the vote. This made Masters the first person since Pat Fiacco to become mayor of Regina with no previous city council experience. She was sworn in as mayor on November 23, 2020.

During her term, Masters became a backer of Regina's catalyst committee, which is tasked with overseeing the potential development of five potential downtown revitalization projects worth nearly $500 million, including new baseball, soccer, and aquatic facilities, a new event centre, and a modernized central library. Masters hired the city's first female manager, Niki Anderson, in 2022 following the dismissal of Chris Holden. By the mid-way point of her mayoral term, Masters also found herself leading a divided city council that saw in-fighting, persistent formal complaints against councillor Terina Nelson, and a fractious debate over affordability and a plan to address homelessness, which included councillor Andrew Stevens being part of a lawsuit against Anderson over budgetary procedural matters. In December 2022, Masters stated that her accomplishments to that point in time centered on bolstering local pride in Regina.

Election results

See also 
 List of mayors of Regina, Saskatchewan

References

External links 
 Mayor of Regina

Mayors of Regina, Saskatchewan
Living people
Women mayors of places in Saskatchewan
21st-century Canadian women politicians
Year of birth missing (living people)